Lee Jong-ho (born 24 February 1992) is a South Korean footballer who plays as forward for Seongnam FC. He was  nicknamed "Gwangyang Rooney" while playing in the K League 1.

Career 
Lee attended Gwangyang Jecheol High School (Jeonnam Dragons U-18 Team). Lee signed a three-year contract with Jeonnam Dragons on 24 February 2011. He made his Jeonnam Dragons debut in a 1–0 League match win over Jeonbuk Hyundai Motors on 6 March 2011, coming on as a substitute for Nam Joon-jae.

He returned to Jeonnam Dragons of K League 2 in 2020. However, left the club in 2021 as the contract was over.

In 2022, he joined Seongnam FC of K League 1.

International career 
On 18 October 2008, Lee accepted the Abdullah Al Dabal MVP award at the AFC U-16 Championship.

Lee played for the South Korea national under-17 football team in the FIFA U-17 World Cup in 2009, and scored two goals for his national side. In 2011, Lee also played for the South Korea national under-20 football team in the FIFA U-20 World Cup

Club career statistics

International goals

Honours

Club 
Jeonbuk Hyundai Motors
AFC Champions League (1): 2016

Ulsan Hyundai
Korean FA Cup (1): 2017

Jeonnam Dragons
Korean FA Cup (1): 2021

International 
South Korea U-23
 Asian Games (1): 2014
South Korea
 EAFF East Asian Cup (1) : 2015

Individual 
 AFC U-16 Championship Most Valuable Player (1): 2008

References

External links 

Lee Jong-ho at Asian Games Incheon 2014

1992 births
Living people
South Korean footballers
Jeonnam Dragons players
Jeonbuk Hyundai Motors players
Ulsan Hyundai FC players
V-Varen Nagasaki players
K League 1 players
K League 2 players
J2 League players
Footballers at the 2014 Asian Games
Asian Games medalists in football
Asian Games gold medalists for South Korea
Medalists at the 2014 Asian Games
Association football forwards
People from Suncheon
Sportspeople from South Jeolla Province